The Sandy and John Black Pavilion at Ole Miss, also known as the SJB Pavilion, is a multi-purpose arena on the campus of the University of Mississippi in University, Mississippi. The $96.5 million multipurpose arena is home to the University of Mississippi Rebels men's and women's basketball teams, with seating for up to 9,500 people. The facility also serves as a secondary student union, with a Steak 'N Shake and a Raising Cane's restaurant available to the community during normal business hours. The Pavilion replaced the Tad Smith Coliseum in January 2016; the opening game, on January 7, saw the Rebels men defeat Alabama 74–66.

Attendance record
All attendance records set have been at men's basketball games.

Non-athletic events

Concerts

 Brad Paisley
 Cam
 Wiz Khalifa

See also

 List of NCAA Division I basketball arenas

References

External links
Ole Miss Breaks Ground on New Arena

College basketball venues in the United States
Ole Miss Rebels basketball
Basketball venues in Mississippi
Buildings and structures in Lafayette County, Mississippi
Sports venues completed in 2016
2016 establishments in Mississippi